Aliaksandr Patsykailik (born 8 March 1990) is a Belarusian handball player. He plays for SKA Minsk and the Belarusian national team.

He competed at the 2016 European Men's Handball Championship.

References

1990 births
Living people
Belarusian male handball players
Sportspeople from Minsk